The Thumbnail is a sea cliff in Kujalleq, South Greenland.

Geography
It is located in Cape Farewell region, ca. 50 km to the east from the town of Nanortalik, over the west side of Torssukátak Fjord (also known as Torssukátak Sound) between the mainland and Pamiagdluk Island. It belongs to the Maujit Qaqarssuasia (Qoqarssuasia) massif, its eastern flank being 1560 m a.s.l. The nearest peak dominating the neighboring ridge is Agdlerussakasit (1760 or 1706 m a.s.l.) and some of the reports on the climbs on the cliff also refer to this summit's name.

Ascents
In 2000, 2003 and 2007 there were established 4 climbing routes on the east face, all starting from the sea. The hardest one is the earliest, British route, established in the steepest, right-hand part of the face in 2000 and graded as English E6, 6b or American 5.12c. The route finishes on the subsidiary top/outcrop (which was in 2000 called as Thumbnail itself) and has altitude approximated by altimeter as 1350 meters a.s.l. (originally 4490 ft, see references, AAJ 2001, pp. 64 and 70).

References
Ian Parnell: Learning Process. American Alpine Journal (AAJ) 2001, pp. 57–70, Greenland: The Thumbnail. Fragile moments, pp. 61–65 (for internet version see external links)
Matt Dickinson (courtesy of Wild Country.co.uk) Climbing the worlds highest sea cliff, Thumbnail in 2000 (Retrieved 2011-11-14)
Cecilia Buil: Agdlerussakasit, east face, Maujit Qoqarssasia (1560 m) first ascent and new route. AAJ 2004, pp. 267–269
Jon Roberts: Agdlerussakasit (1750 m), east face, new route on east face; The Butler (900 m) and Mark (900 m), first ascents. AAJ 2004, pp. 266–267
planetFear.com article, Brian McAlinden, Greenland: New Route on Thumbnail, September 2007(Retrieved 2011-11-14)

External links
Ian Parnell: Learning Process. American Alpine Journal 2001, pp. 57-70, internet version as pdf file (Retrieved 2011-11-14).
A detailed description of the various expeditions and climbs on the Thumbnail cliffs of Maujit Qaqarssuasia (Retrieved 2015-10-22).

Mountains of Greenland
Cliffs